Brilliance may refer to:

Brilliance (gemstone), a measure of the light performance of gemstone diamonds
Brilliance (graphics editor), a bitmap graphics editor for the Amiga
Brilliance (synchrotron light), the quality of an x-ray source
Brilliance (Atlantic Starr album), 1982
Brilliance, an album by Chieko Kawabe, 2005
The Brilliance, an American indie band
Brilliance Audio, an ebook subsidiary of Amazon
Brilliance Auto, a Chinese car company
 Brilliance, a novel by Marcus Sakey, 2013

See also
Brightness
Spectral radiance
Brillant (disambiguation)
Brilliant (disambiguation)